The Nimrod is a long-range air-to-surface missile developed by Israel Aerospace Industries. While designed for mainly anti-tank warfare, it provides standoff strike ability against a variety of point targets such as armoured personnel carriers (APCs), ships, bunkers, personnel concentrations, and guerrillas.

Nimrod has a semi-active laser guidance system, that operates day or night.

Nimrod may be installed on a variety of towed launchers, light combat vehicle launchers, helicopters, and fixed-wing aircraft. The primary helicopter launch platform for the Nimrod in the Israel Defense Forces is a modified Sikorsky CH-53 Sea Stallion helicopter. The launching vehicle or aircraft may fire up to 4 Nimrods at once from a single pack.

Description
Nimrod is a long-range semi-active laser-guided anti-tank guided missile (ATGM), developed by the MBT Weapon System Division. It has a solid-propellant rocket and can operate day or night. It can also serve as an anti-ship missile.

Nimrod allows a gunner to pre-select a flight trajectory mode.

Mid-course guidance is provided by an inertial navigation system, and terminal guidance by a semi-active laser homing seeker. The target can be illuminated either by a ground-based or airborne laser designator.

The gimballed and stabilised seeker head acquires, tracks and homes in on its target using localised proportional navigation. It is said to have a view angle of more than 30°. In the terminal flight phase, the weapon adopts a dive angle of approximately 45° to strike an armoured target on the thinner, more vulnerable upper surfaces.

The missile is stored in a sealed canister which also acts as the launcher. It has five main sections: seeker, guidance and control, warhead, solid-propellant rocket motor, and servo. It is roll-stabilised in flight. Time to come into action at a launch site is less than 3 minutes; there is no need to survey the site for alignment or levelling, nor does it require a direct line of sight to a target. The weapon can be fired in single-round, ripple, or salvo modes.

Characteristics
 Effective range: 300 - 36,000 meters
 Length: 265 cm
 Diameter: 17 cm
 Body: 18 cm
 Span 40 cm
 Weight: 100 kg
 Speed: ~1000 km/h or Mach 0.8
 Propulsion: Single stage solid-propellant rocket motor 
 Guidance: Semi-active laser homing
 Warhead: High-explosive anti-tank (HEAT), fragmentation high explosive (HE), thermobaric, or anti-personnel

Variants
, three Nimrod versions exist:
This missile is well suited to rapid response and for coastal defence.
 Nimrod 3 – An extended variant of Nimrod 2. It supports various warheads for a wide range of targets, and has a mobile launcher.
Nimrod SR – A short-range variant that can be fired from ground and airborne platforms.

Operators

Current operators

Comparable systems
 Spike NLOS
 AGM-169 Joint Common Missile (JCM)

See also
 LAHAT, renamed Nimrod-SR for the Latin American market.

References

External links
 Nimrod (Mikhol, Mikholit) missile at Jane's
 Nimrod 3 extended range at Deagel.com

Air-to-surface missiles
Anti-tank guided missiles of Israel
IAI missiles